Kara (also Lemusmus or Lemakot) is an Austronesian language spoken by about 5,000 people in 1998 in the Kavieng District of New Ireland Province, Papua New Guinea.

Laxudumau, spoken in the village of Lakudumau, is transitional to Nalik.

Phonology

Consonants 

Kara contains fourteen consonants. Single consonants are found within the head of a word, intervocalically between two vowels, finally and in sequences of less than two words medially. Voiceless consonants  create a cluster on the second consonant. Voiced consonants  appear initially and intervocally. They appear as the second consonant of a cluster. An example would be  'tree sap'. It is notable that different dialects change the use of consonants.

Vowels 

Kara contains ten vowels. Relative to their position in the IPA vowel chart, the vowels in Kara tend to contrast each other throughout the language. Central vowels  and  contrast in both open and closed syllables. Example:

  'east',  'instrument/accompany'

Each pair occurs in open syllables, a syllable consisting of an onset and nucleus but no coda.

  'locative' and  'betray', compared to  'mute' and [ɸɔt] 'type of fishing'

  'break (a rope)' and  'hit (inanimate object)' 
  'husk' and  'erupt/explode'

Stress 
Kara has an unusual occurrence of stress, or relative emphasis of syllables. Stress in Kara occurs on any syllable in a word, but follows a system of rules that allow placement of stress in an ordered system in all words that contain two syllables or more. However, syllables stemmed from prefixes are never stressed regardless of the ordered system. Stress is determined by three factors: vowel quality, syllable closure, and position in the word, with vowel quality being the most important factor.

Syllables and stress 
A syllable with a nucleus of  receives primary stress regardless of its position in the word.

  'plant'
  'one-leg'
  'we'

A word with more than one syllable and a nucleus of  has the stress fall on the last syllable..

  'muddy'

  'axe'

Grammar 
Kara follows a verb–subject–object word order, and uses reduplication for creation of more complex sentences. The language determines that body parts and kinship terms must be identified as belonging to someone which make it possible for inalienable possession.

Verbs 
Verbs in Kara are used transitively, meaning that the verbs in Kara span a spectrum that ultimately determines how speaking the language occurs between an object and that verb. Transitivity of verbs is used to also determine whether or not the spoken language is between two people actively who are actively speakers, rather than a speaker and a listener. For example: the verb  'say' has an initiator but no one to actively speak to.

Reduplication 
Reduplication occurs in words with an initial plosive consonant. The reduplicated consonant created is said fricatively within the same articulation of the word.

  'secured/confined' (cf.  'tie')
  'striking' (cf.  'hit'
  'lying' (cf.  'lie'
  'talking' (cf.  'say')

Inalienable possession 

Notes

Bibliography

Meso-Melanesian languages
Languages of New Ireland Province